The Regional Security System (RSS) is an international agreement for the defence and security of the eastern Caribbean region with future expansion planned with South America.

History 
The Regional Security System was created in 1982 to counter threats to the stability of the region in the late 1970s and early 1980s. On 29 October, four members of the Organisation of Eastern Caribbean States (Antigua and Barbuda, Dominica, Saint Lucia, and Saint Vincent and the Grenadines) signed a memorandum of understanding (MOU) with Barbados to provide for "mutual assistance on request". The signatories agreed to prepare contingency plans and assist one another, on request, in national emergencies, prevention of smuggling, search and rescue, immigration control, fishery protection, customs and excise control, maritime policing duties, protection of off-shore installations, pollution control, national and other disasters, and threats to national security. Saint Kitts and Nevis joined following independence in 1983, and Grenada followed two years later after Operation Urgent Fury, a combined US and RSS invasion of the country. The MOU was updated in 1992 and the system acquired juridical status on 5 March 1996 under the Treaty which was signed at St. Georges, Grenada.

The RSS initially started as a US instrument to combat the spread of communism in the Caribbean region. As of 2001, the RSS further cooperates with the CARICOM Regional Task Force on Crime and Security (CRTFCS).

In June 2010, United States and Caribbean regional officials resumed a plan for close cooperation established under the former Partnership for Prosperity and Security in the Caribbean (PPS) from the Clinton era.  As part of the joint agreement the United States pledged assistance with the creation of an Eastern Caribbean Coast Guard unit among RSS countries.  The United States Coast Guard unit will underpin the wider US-Caribbean Basin Security Initiative (CBSI) which has deemed the RSS as "central to the CBSI’s success, given its reach across the Eastern Caribbean."

Subsequently, Canada also pledged collaboration with the RSS bloc to combat a threat of Central American criminal gangs from expanding into the English-speaking Caribbean region.

Previous activities 

The RSS is based in Barbados at the Paragon Centre, headed by many regional army chiefs. It mainly serves as a defence system for the Caribbean Sea, conducting many operations by detecting and combating cross-Atlantic and intra-Caribbean drug smuggling, protection of the sovereignty of the nations of the Caribbean, providing assistance to Caribbean countries at the request of governments and are usually the first to respond after natural disasters occur, such as hurricanes, floods and earthquakes.

Member states 
The current member nations are:
 (since 1982)
 (since 1982)
 (since 1982)
 (since 1985)
 (since 1983)
 (since 1982)
 (since 1982)

 (since 2022)
In 2022 following the International Energy Conference and Expo Guyana 2022, it was declared that The Co-Operative Republic of Guyana would be signing onto the protocol as a member of the RSS. In September 2022, Guyana formally joined the RSS after the president of Guyana signed the Instrument of Accession.

See also 
 Military alliance
 List of military alliances
 Caribbean Peace Force
 Royal Canadian Mounted Police (RCMP)
 United States Southern Command (USSOUTHCOM)
 Caribbean Disaster Emergency Response Agency (CDERA)
 North Atlantic Treaty Organization (NATO)
 Organisation of Eastern Caribbean States (OECS)

References

Further reading

External links 
 

 
Anti-communism
Disaster preparedness in the Caribbean
Defence organisations based in Barbados
United States–Caribbean relations
Canada–Caribbean relations
Treaties of Antigua and Barbuda
Treaties of Barbados
Treaties of Dominica
Treaties of Grenada
Treaties of Saint Kitts and Nevis
Treaties of Saint Lucia
Treaties of Saint Vincent and the Grenadines
Treaties concluded in 1996
Barbados–Grenada relations
Grenada–Saint Vincent and the Grenadines relations
Saint Lucia–Saint Vincent and the Grenadines relations
Antigua and Barbuda–Saint Lucia relations
Antigua and Barbuda–Grenada relations